Sooglossus is a genus of sooglossid frogs found in the Seychelles.

Species
There are two species recognised in the genus Sooglossus:
 Seychelles frog (Sooglossus sechellensis) 
 Thomasset's Seychelles frog (Sooglossus thomasseti)

References

 
Amphibian genera
Taxa named by George Albert Boulenger